Fred Hume was a college football player. A quarterback for the Vanderbilt Commodores, he weighed just 122 pounds. After college, he worked for the International Shoe Company in St. Louis.

References

American football quarterbacks
Vanderbilt Commodores football players